The Notre-Dame du Kreisker chapel (Breton: Chapel Itron-Varia ar C'hreiz-kêr; French: Chapelle Notre-Dame du Kreisker) is a Roman Catholic chapel in Saint-Pol-de-Léon in Brittany. With its 78 meters rising up in the sky, the church tower of the "Chapelle du Kreisker" is the highest in Brittany. The word Kreisker means the downtown.

Built in the 14th and 15th centuries on the site of an ancient place of worship, it's one of the major works of Breton religious architecture and a testimony of the flourishing economy of the town in the 15th century with the highest (78 m) and most audacious belfry in Brittany. An essential coastal landmark for navigation, it was for that reason restored and thus saved from destruction on Napoleon’s order in 1807. Striking circular view from the top (169 steps).

History
The origin of the chapel goes back to the 6th century. A young linen maid who had worked on a holiday in the honour of the Virgin, despite Saint Kirec disapproval became suddenly completely paralysed. After her repentance the Saint healed her and she gave him her house to be converted into a chapel. The chapel was called "Kreis-Ker" because it was located in the middle of a village, in the inner suburb of St Pol de Léon. It is likely that the first chapel was made of wood and it must not have withstood the ravages of the Normans in the 9th century.

The tradition related that the English after having burnt the town in 1375, have rebuilt the Kreisker. Some architectural features such as the "perpendicular style" at the base of the tower are the obvious sign of an influence from across the Channel. Settled on a long-term basis in St Pol de Léon after the war of succession of Brittany, the English could, indeed, convert the tower into a look-out post turned towards the sea and the surrounding countryside. A guard room in the north porch is a virtually intact example of a conventional accommodation at the end of the 14th century.

Between 1439 and 1472, after the departure of the English, the tower was crowned by a superb spire and the edifice was slightly modified.
The steeple has been saved from demolition by Napoléon in 1807 thanks to its usefulness for navigation. Throughout the middle ages until the Revolution, the city council used the Kreisker as assembly room.

Still today, the chapel and its tower applies a powerful presence on the city. Norman and British influences are visible on the architecture of this classified historic monument.

Description
The tower rests on 4 pillars each side of a height of 3.20 m. When comparing the light-weight of the pillars to the height of the tower they support, one can hardly understand that this massive structure stands on apparently such a weak foundation. Magnificent specimen of "clocher à jour" the granite spire is an octagon pierced by 80 openings which do not let the wind buffet it. The north porch (flamboyant style) is  more work than the south porch (contrary to the tradition of the period).

From the balustrade that can be accessed by a staircase of 169 steps, one can enjoy a splendid and awesome panorama. The church tower can be accessed in July and August to allow the viewer to enjoy the view on all the region from its top railing.

The main features of the Kreisker chapel are:-

The north portal 
The north portal and porch is carved from granite. The triangular pediment over the porch had held carvings of the coats of arms of many of the chapel's benefactors but these were chiseled away during the French Revolution. At the porch's summit is a statue of the Virgin Mary with child which dates to the 15th century. The external arcade of the porch is decorated with ten statuettes depicting bearded patriarchs. In the Voussoirs are carvings of vine leaves, thistles and cabbages.  Inside the porch five niches on either side hold niches but no statues were ever completed to fill them. The porch leads to two doors giving entry to the cathedral and these are decorated with carvings of different kinds of foliage, monsters, domestic animals  griffons and chimères.

The south porch 
Above the portal of the south porch is a tribune known as the "benediction"

Pulpit 

The Kreisker pulpit ("chaire à prêcher") in fact came from the cathedral in 1975. It dates to the 18th century. The "abat-voix" is covered by a dome surmounted by an angel playing a trumpet.  Two caryatids decorate the pulpit and the pulpit stairway is decorated with bas-reliefs depicting the Virgin Mary with child, Saint Paul and Saint Paul Aurélien.

Autel de la Vierge

Memorial to Mons Péron 
Péron was a principal of the Léon college who died in 1827.

Statue of Christ awaiting crucifixion 

This dramatic sculpture of Jesus Christ awaiting crucifixion, his hands tied and his body bloodied from the beating he had sustained dates to the 16th century. The statue is carved from wood and polychromed. This statue is shown on the front cover.

Altar with altarpiece and tabernacle."Le grand retable de la Visitation" 
This two-tiered altar, the altar of the Visitation, came from the Convent of the Minimes which was subsequently destroyed and was moved to the Kreisker chapel after the French revolution. It dates back to 1684 and was the work of the sculptors Guillaume and François Lerrel. It is a magnificent piece and the inscription on the pediment reads "OMNIA IN GLORIA DOMINI ; IHS ; MAR". The altar has four twisted columns, magnificently carved, and a painting on canvas of the "visitation" and a copy of the "Albane".  The doors of the altar's tabernacle are decorated with bas-reliefs depicting the prophet Elijah in the desert and the sacrifice of Abraham on the doors of the altar's tabernacle as well as the last supper. The altar is also decorated with statues of Saint Nicholas and Sainte Marguerite. On the altarpiece are another two bas-reliefs that on the left  representing Saint Raymond de Pennafort at sea accompanied by two of his followers and that on the right a bishop receiving "le cordon" from Saint Francis whilst an angel holds the cross Saint Francis is carried on the clouds.  The painting is a copy of the painting of the Albane the original of which can be seen in the Bordeaux museum.

On each side of the chapel's master altar and above the sacristy door are two bas-reliefs. That on the right represents Moses receiving the tablets whilst that on the left depicts the "serpent d'airain" and the camp of the Hebrews. Above the master altar are statues of Saint Stanislas Kostka and Saint Louis de Gonzague. These early 18th-century statues came to Kreisker from the Chapelle du séminaire. Saint Louis de Gonzague was canonised in 1726 and Saint Stanislas Kostka in 1725.

The vase from Kerliviry 
In the square in front of the chapel there is a monumental granite vase dating to the 16th century. It came from Kerliviry.

Miscellaneous-Kreisker chapel

War memorial maquette 
The Kreisker chapel holds a plaster maquette of a 1919 war memorial ("monument aux morts") by the Breton sculptor René Quillivic.

See also
List of works of the two Folgoët ateliers

Bibliography
  Philippe Abjean, Notre-Dame du Kreisker, Léon'Art éditions, 2011, 171 p.

References

External links

 Brittany & Its Byways, by Fanny Bury Palliser 

15th-century Roman Catholic church buildings in France
Chapels in France
Churches in Finistère
Monuments historiques of Finistère